George Spriggs may refer to:

 George Spriggs (baseball) (born 1937), American baseball player
 George Spriggs (politician) (1926–2015), Australian politician